Myrtle 'Molly' Kool (February 23, 1916 – February 25, 2009) was a Canadian sea captain. She is recognized as being one of the first North American registered female sea captains or ship master. She was one of the first female Master Mariner in Canada.

Biography

Early life
Kool was born in Alma, New Brunswick, the daughter of Myrtle Anderson and Paul Kool, the latter of whom was a Dutch sailor. She grew up sailing, eventually becoming captain of Jean K, a  scow owned by her father.

Career
At age 21, Kool joined the Merchant Marine School in Saint John, New Brunswick, being the only woman to ever do so. On April 19, 1939, Kool graduated and received her Master Mariner's papers from the Merchant Marine Institution in Yarmouth, Nova Scotia. As a result, a line in the Canadian Shipping Act had to be amended to read "he or she."  Her father turned the title to the scow over to her and she captained it for five years, working mainly the pulp and paper trade in the Bay of Fundy.

Later life and death
In 1944, after her ship caught fire, Kool left life at sea to marry Ray Blaisdell of Bucksport, Maine in 1944. Blaisdell died in the 1960s. and she remarried, to John Carney of Orrington, Maine. Kool eventually retired fully after losing both her legs to a vascular disease.

In 2003, a sailing ship was named in her honour. A monument to her accomplishment was erected near the wharf in Alma. Scheduled in 2011, the home she grew up in is being rebuilt with the original remains and an exhibit is coming to the entrance of Fundy National Park.

Kool spent her remaining years in a seniors care home in Bangor, Maine. She died from pneumonia in a hospital in Bangor, aged 93. Her ashes were scattered on the Bay of Fundy at Herring Cove, near her birthplace.

References

External links
 
 
 Obituary in the Morning Sentinel

1916 births
2009 deaths
Sea captains
Canadian sailors
People from Albert County, New Brunswick
People from Bangor, Maine
Deaths from pneumonia in Maine